Smithsonidrilus multiglandularis is a species of oligochaete worms, first found in Puerto Rico and Florida.

References

External links
WORMS

Fauna of Puerto Rico
Tubificina